The 2000 National Lacrosse League season is the 14th season in the NLL that began on January 7, 2000 and concluded with the championship game on May 6, 2000. The Toronto Rock defeated the Rochester Knighthawks 14-13. Kaleb Toth scored the winning goal with less than two seconds left in regulation to give the Rock their second straight championship.

Team movement
One expansion team was added to the NLL for the 2000 season, the Albany Attack. In addition, the Baltimore Thunder left Baltimore and became the Pittsburgh CrosseFire, though the franchise would only last a single season in Pittsburgh before moving to Washington.

Regular season

All Star Game
No All-Star game was held in 2000.

Playoffs

Awards

Weekly awards
Each week, a player is awarded "Player of the Week" honours.

Monthly awards
Awards are also given out monthly for the best overall player and best rookie.

Statistics leaders
Bold numbers indicate new single-season records. Italics indicate tied single-season records.

See also
 2000 in sports

External links
2000 Archive at the Outsider's Guide to the NLL

References

00
NLL season